John Keith Boles (January 31, 1888 – July 16, 1952) was an American sport shooter who competed in the 1924 Summer Olympics in Paris, where he won one individual gold medal (Running Deer) and one bronze medal as a member of the US team (Running Deer, Team).

He was born in Fort Smith, Arkansas.

References

1888 births
1952 deaths
American male sport shooters
Shooters at the 1924 Summer Olympics
Olympic gold medalists for the United States in shooting
Olympic bronze medalists for the United States in shooting
Medalists at the 1924 Summer Olympics